Farrand F. Merrill (October 24, 1814 – May 2, 1859) was a Vermont attorney and Whig politician who served as Secretary of State of Vermont and in other offices.

Biography
Farrand Fassett Merrill was born in Montpelier, Vermont on October 24, 1814.  His mother was Clara Fassett Merrill, and his father Timothy Merrill served as Secretary of State from 1831 to 1836.

Farrand Merrill studied law and worked as his father's deputy while Timothy Merrill was Clerk of the Vermont House of Representatives and Secretary of State.  He was admitted to the bar in 1836, and practiced in Montpelier.  From 1838 to 1849 he served as Clerk of the Vermont House.  From 1849 to 1853, he was Vermont's Secretary of State.  In 1847, he received the honorary degree of Master of Arts from the University of Vermont.

From 1854 to 1856, Merrill was state's attorney of Washington County.  In 1856 and 1857 he served as a member of the Vermont House.  Among the prospective attorneys who studied under Merrill was Charles Herbert Joyce, who attained admission to the bar in 1852, and succeeded Merrill as state's attorney.

Merrill died at his office in Montpelier on May 2, 1859.  He had been ill at home during the days leading up to his death, but decided on May 2 to keep an appointment to discuss forming a law partnership with Whitman G. Ferrin.  He began to suffer chest pains at his office, and a doctor was summoned.  Shortly afterwards, Merrill died, probably from the effects of a stroke.  Merrill was buried at Green Mount Cemetery in Montpelier.

His name sometimes appears in records as "Ferrand".

Family
In 1844, Merrill married Eliza Maria Wright of Montpelier.  They were the parents of three children: Chester W., Charlotte H., and Mary A. Merrill.

Farrand F. Merrill was the nephew of Orsamus Cook Merrill, who served as a member of Congress from Vermont.

References

Sources

Books

Internet

Newspapers

1814 births
1859 deaths
People from Montpelier, Vermont
Vermont lawyers
Vermont Whigs
Members of the Vermont House of Representatives
Secretaries of State of Vermont
State's attorneys in Vermont
Burials at Green Mount Cemetery (Montpelier, Vermont)
19th-century American lawyers